Love Without Distance is a 2015 Chinese romantic comedy film directed by Aubrey Lam. It was released in China on May 21, 2015.

Cast
Francis Ng
Yao Xingtong
Ma Tianyu
Li Jing
Cica Zhou

Reception
Love Without Distance opened in China on May 22, 2015, earning $3.55 million in its opening weekend, which was the highest-opening for a Chinese film that weekend and falling in third place at the Chinese box office behind Hollywood film Avengers: Age of Ultron and Bollywood film PK.

References

2015 romantic comedy films
Chinese romantic comedy films